Southview is a residential neighbourhood in the southeast quadrant of Calgary, Alberta. It is bounded by 17 Avenue SE to the north, 36 Street SE to the east, 26 Avenue SE to the south and the Bow River to the west.

Southview was established in 1950, being the last community to develop inside the Greater Forest Lawn Area and is part of the International Avenue Business Revitalization Zone. It is represented in the Calgary City Council by the Ward 9 councillor.

Demographics

Residents in this community had a median household income of $44,908 in 2000, and there were 23.7% low income residents living in the neighbourhood. As of 2000, 14.9% of the residents were immigrants. A proportion of 18.5% of the buildings were condominiums or apartments, and 33.9% of the housing was used for renting.

Education
The community is served by the Mountain View Elementary public school.

See also
List of neighbourhoods in Calgary

References

External links
Southview Community Association

Neighbourhoods in Calgary